The 2015 Under 21 Women's Australian Hockey Championship was a women's field hockey tournament. The competition was held in the Tasmanian city of Hobart, from 12 to 19 July.

Victoria won the gold medal, defeating New South Wales 3–2 in the final. Queensland finished in third place after a 4–1 win against Western Australia in the third place match.

Competition format
The tournament is divided into two pools, Pool A and Pool B, consisting of four teams in a round robin format. Teams then progress into either Pool C, the medal round, or Pool D, the classification round. Teams carry over points from their previous match ups, and contest teams they are yet to play.

The top two teams in each of pools A and B then progress to Pool C. The top two teams in Pool C continue to contest the Final, while the bottom two teams of Pool C play in the Third and Fourth place match.

The remaining bottom placing teams make up Pool D. The top two teams in Pool D play in the Fifth and Sixth place match, while the bottom two teams of Pool C play in the Seventh and Eighth place match.

Teams

 ACT
 NSW AAP
 NSW
 QLD
 SA
 TAS
 VIC
 WA

Results
All times are local (AEST).

Preliminary round

Pool A

Pool B

Second round

Pool C (Medal Round)

Pool D (Classification Round)

Classification matches

Seventh and eighth place

Fifth and sixth place

Third and fourth place

Final

Statistics

Final standings

References

External links

2015
2015 in Australian women's field hockey
Sport in Hobart